The Crazy Gang is a nickname coined by the English media in reference to the Wimbledon F.C. teams of the 1980s and '90s. The name, originally that of a well known group of British comedy entertainers popular in the late 1930s, became commonly associated with Wimbledon as a result of the often cheeky and boisterously macho behaviour of their players, who were in the habit of playing frequent and outrageous practical jokes on each other and on the club's managers Dave Bassett, Bobby Gould and Joe Kinnear, as well as many of their players' highly aggressive, physical style of play and reputation for a lack of discipline on the pitch.

Despite enjoying decent success as a fixture in the First Division and later Premier League at the time, their general approach to the game was often derided by others in the sport as unprofessional and simplistic in comparison to the style of football played by most of their top-flight contemporaries at the time; then England striker Gary Lineker once commented dismissively, "the best way to watch Wimbledon is on Ceefax", criticising the team's supposedly unsophisticated approach to football. Their physical style and aggressive reputation on the field often intimidated their supposedly more skilled opponents and helped the club to the most successful period in its history, as they won the 1988 FA Cup and also achieved regular finishes in the top half of the league.

The name originated in the immediate aftermath of Wimbledon's 1988 FA Cup final victory over Liverpool, when BBC commentator John Motson declared that "the crazy gang has beaten the culture club". Most closely associated with the team of that period, notable members included Vinnie Jones, Dennis Wise, Dave Beasant, John Fashanu and Lawrie Sanchez. Under the management of Dave Bassett, they climbed from the Fourth Division to the First Division in four seasons leading up to 1986 without ever changing their straightforward playing style.

History

Although the club had been known for its players' oftentimes outlandish behaviour since the early 1980s, the team became more widely recognised for it following their promotion to the First Division in 1986. Practical jokes and initiations for new players were commonplace; these ranged from players being stripped and forced to walk home naked to belongings being set on fire to players being tied to the roof of a car at the training ground and driven at high speeds along the A3 among a multitude of others, with long-serving midfielder Vinnie Jones saying "you either grew a backbone quickly or dissolved as a man", in reference to the club's boisterous culture. As the now top-flight team received more attention for their antics from the media, they also became subject to criticism from many pundits and fellow players, who accused the team of taking a "simplified, overly aggressive, and intimidating" approach to football in comparison to the other teams in the league. This newfound scrutiny created a close bond and tenacious camaraderie among the players, who adopted an "us vs them" mentality on the field as more and more opposing teams feared the side and their reputation. Players such as Vinnie Jones and John Fashanu were often accused of showing little regard for their opponents and deliberately making dangerous, risky tackles. Both received significant attention after both Gary Stevens and Gary Mabbutt of Tottenham Hotspur were injured in separate incidents following challenges from Jones and Fashanu respectively; Stevens never fully recovered from the injuries suffered as a result of Jones' tackle and retired four years later.

As the team saw a sustained degree of success in the First Division, their most famous moment came in 1988, when they upset league champions Liverpool to win the FA Cup. The "Crazy Gang" nickname was coined at the final whistle, when BBC commentator John Motson declared that "The Crazy Gang have beaten the Culture Club". The name then caught on nationally, frequently appearing in newspaper reports, and was often used in TV and radio coverage of the club. The team finished seventh in the league that season, having finished sixth a year earlier on their debut in the top flight.

Despite many key members of the original group leaving in the aftermath of the FA Cup final victory, the media and the club itself continued to use the nickname, with Wimbledon chairman Sam Hammam adopting it for marketing purposes and having it embroidered on the team's shirts for a period of time in the 1990s. The club continued to achieve respectable finishes in the top flight throughout the 1990s, and were founding members of the Premier League in 1992. They finished in the top 10 of the league a total of seven times, peaking at sixth place in 1987 and again in 1994, and reached the semi-finals of both the FA Cup and the League Cup in the 1996-97 season. Their final serious attempt at winning silverware came in the 1998-99 season, when they again reached the semi-finals of the League Cup. Wimbledon were relegated from the Premier League in 2000 after 14 years in the top flight, by which time the name had become inappropriate as a description of its latest generation of players, although the club still continued to use it for some years to promote itself commercially. In 2002, the original club was relocated to Milton Keynes and later became known as M.K. Dons; supporters of the club were strongly opposed to moving the club so far away from Wimbledon, and formed AFC Wimbledon in the aftermath of the announcement. As of the 2022–23 season, MK Dons play in EFL League One, whilst AFC Wimbledon play in EFL League Two, having being relegated from League One in the previous season.

Members 
Below is a list of notable members of the group, who were widely known to partake in the group's notorious off-field antics, though the nickname was applied to the entire squad for much of the late 1980s and 1990s.

See also
Spice Boys of Liverpool
Sam Hammam
The Crazy Gang

References

Wimbledon F.C.
Nicknamed groups of association football players
Practical jokes